Life is a British nature documentary series created and produced by the BBC in association with The Open University. It was first broadcast as part of the BBC's Darwin Season on BBC One and BBC HD from October to December 2009. The series takes a global view of the specialised strategies and extreme behaviour that living things have developed in order to survive; what Charles Darwin termed "the struggle for existence". Four years in the making, the series was shot entirely in high definition.

Life premiered on 12 October 2009 in the United Kingdom consisting of ten 50-minute episodes. The opening programme gives a general introduction to the series, a second look at plants, and the remainder are dedicated to some of the major animal groups. They aim to show common features that have contributed to the success of each group, and to document intimate and dramatic moments in the lives of selected species chosen for their charisma or their extraordinary behaviour. A ten-minute making-of feature Life on Location aired at the end of each episode, taking the total running time to 60 minutes.

Life is produced by the BBC Natural History Unit and The Open University. It is distributed under licence by the BBC in over 50 other countries, including by the Discovery Channel in the United States and Skai TV in Greece. The original script was written and narrated by David Attenborough.

Production

Production team 
Life was the first series commissioned by the then Network Controller of BBC One, Peter Fincham, just weeks after he took up the post in March 2005. It was reportedly one of the most expensive documentaries ever ordered by the broadcaster, with a budget of £10 million (though the BBC have never confirmed this figure).
The Natural History Unit's production team includes series producer Martha Holmes (Life in the Freezer, The Blue Planet) and executive producer Mike Gunton (Galápagos, Life in the Undergrowth). Individual episodes were produced by Rupert Barrington, Adam Chapman, Martha Holmes, Neil Lucas, Patrick Morris and Ted Oakes. The specially-commissioned score was composed by George Fenton and performed by the Band of Life. The opening titles and brand imaging were created by Burrell Durrant Hifle.

In February 2007, Gunton revealed that the BBC were looking for a new narrator for the series owing to Attenborough's imminent retirement. However, later that year it was announced that the veteran narrator would be collaborating on both this series and the forthcoming Frozen Planet.

Filming 
The first year of production was spent researching possible stories for the series. The Life team contacted scientists and experts around the world in search of new discoveries to film, and new approaches to familiar subjects. Nearly three years of filming followed, involving 150 shoots on all seven continents, many of them full-scale expeditions to remote wilderness areas.

New camera technology was used to build on the cinematic techniques first employed in Planet Earth, notably the pioneering use of stabilised helicopter-mounted cameras. The Life crew succeeded in using gyroscopic stabilisation to create steady shots from moving vehicles, even on rough terrain, allowing the cameras to track alongside reindeer and elephant herds for the first time. Miniature high-definition cameras were used extensively for the "Insects" programme. In the forests of Mexico, the crew erected a spider's web of cables in the canopy to give the sense of flying alongside millions of monarch butterflies. In Zambia, they filmed from a hot air balloon to avoid disturbing the huge flocks of straw-coloured fruit bats.

Following recent debate about the use of artifice in natural history programmes, the BBC were more candid about sequences which had not been filmed in the wild. Close-ups of wild clownfish would have disturbed their natural behaviour, so captive animals were filmed in an aquarium at a Welsh university.

Despite the best efforts of the film-makers, some sequences ended up on the cutting room floor. Scientists in Arctic Scandinavia had accumulated enough evidence to suggest that golden eagles were the main predators of reindeer calves, but an attack had never been witnessed. After two summers tracking the herds in Finland, cameraman Barrie Britton finally filmed a hunt in full. However, the attack had taken place nearly a mile away, and the footage was too distant to be considered for broadcast.

Television firsts 
The budget and timescale for the series enabled the producers to set ambitious filming challenges, and expedition crews brought back several sequences which have never been shown before.

Some involved highly specialised hunting behaviour that has only recently been discovered. In the shallow, muddy waters of Florida Bay, one pod of bottlenose dolphins have learned a unique hunting technique called mud-ring feeding. Aerial photography shows the lead dolphin circling a shoal of mullet, flicking its tail flukes to disturb mud on the seabed. The fish trapped inside the mud ring panic and leap out of the water to escape the trap, straight into the waiting mouths of the pod. In Kenya's Lewa Wildlife Conservancy, three cheetah brothers have learned to take on prey many times their own size. They are filmed bringing down an ostrich, but also hunt zebra, eland and oryx. A film crew travelled to the Falkland Islands to follow up reports of an orca that had learned to take elephant seal pups from a nursery pool. On the Indonesian island of Rinca, the first footage of Komodo dragons hunting a water buffalo corroborated new scientific evidence suggesting the dragons used venom to kill their prey.

Other sequences had previously proved too difficult to film. The humpback whale heat run has been dubbed "the biggest battle on Earth", but the whales move so fast that underwater cameras struggle to keep up. The Life crew used cameras mounted on helicopters and boats along with a team of free-divers to follow the action. The biggest filming challenge was to show a year in the life of an oak woodland using timelapse photography. After capturing real-world footage of a Devon wood, the crew rebuilt the entire scene in a studio in Exeter and digitally superimposed 96 separate layers of footage to create the final one-minute sequence. The whole project took two years.

Super high-speed cameras capable of shooting up to 8,000 frames per second were used to slow down dramatic action. For the first time, these were used underwater to reveal the hunting behaviour of sailfish. They were also used to show 'Jesus Christ lizards' running on water, the courtship flight of the marvellous spatuletail and flying fish leaving the water. The first footage showing Antarctic killer whales hunting a crabeater seal, but the seal survived.

The pebble toad's strange escape method had been caught on tape for the first time.

Broadcast 
Life debuted on British television on 12 October 2009, with a standard definition broadcast on BBC One and a high-definition simulcast on BBC HD.

The series was sold to international broadcasters by the BBC's commercial arm, BBC Worldwide, and marketed under the BBC Earth brand used for all BBC-produced natural history content. The global success of Life was noted as one of the key factors behind BBC Worldwide's record profits in 2010.

The series received its North American premiere on Discovery Channel Canada on 15 November 2009. In the US, the series premiered on 21 March 2010 on Discovery Channel with Attenborough's narration replaced by Oprah Winfrey reading from a different script tailored to American audiences. Each episode was curtailed in length to accommodate commercial breaks. The behind-the-scenes shorts were dropped for the same reason, and instead were compiled into an eleventh episode.

Life was also acquired by several Latin American broadcasters and debuted on 18 March 2010 on Discovery Channel Latin America and Discovery HD Theater, with narration by Colombian singer Juanes.

In Israel the series aired in July 2010 as part of the new IBA channel Channel 1 HD and it was narrated by Orna Banay.

In Turkey, the series aired in May 2010 on NTV (Turkey). It was narrated by famous Turkish actor Tuncel Kurtiz.

In Australia, an edited version (without Life on Location) with Attenborough's narration aired on ABC1 each Sunday at 7:30 pm from 25 July 2010.

In Croatia the series aired each Saturday from 2 October 2010 on HRT1.

Episodes

Inside Life 

A complementary children's TV series, Inside Life, aired on the CBBC Channel and followed young volunteers as they go behind the scenes with the Life production team and accompany the film-makers on expeditions in the field. It began airing on 13 October 2009.

One Life
In 2011, BBC Earth used Attenborough's footage of animals to create a documentary film called One Life, narrated by Daniel Craig.

Reception 
The series was nominated for six Primetime Emmy Awards in July 2010. These included a nomination for Outstanding Nonfiction Series along with selections in a number of technical categories. The episode "Challenges of Life" went on to win the Outstanding Cinematography for Nonfiction Programming award.

In June 2010, Life won two Rockies at the Banff World Television Festival for best wildlife and natural history programme and best documentary.

In October 2010, Life was awarded the Jury's Special Prize at the Wildscreen Festival.

DVD, Blu-ray Disc and book 
The series was released in the UK as Region 2, four-disc DVD (BBCDVD3068) and Blu-ray Disc (BBCBD0055) box sets by 2Entertain on 30 November 2009. Region 1 DVD and Blu-ray Discs of both the BBC and Discovery versions of the series were released on 1 June 2010. In Australia, a Region 4, four-disc DVD and Blu-ray Disc was released by ABC DVD/Village Roadshow on 7 October 2010.

A hardcover book written by producers Martha Holmes and Michael Gunton accompanies the television series. Life was published in the UK by BBC Books on 1 October 2009.

References

External links 
 
 Life at BBC Earth
 Life on the Eden website
 Life website at Discovery Channel US
 Life at the Discovery Channel (Canada) website
 
 Behind-the-scenes information at OpenLearn, the BBC/OU online learning portal
 "The Wildlife of Life – 62 clips from the series and information on the animals, plants, habitats and adaptations featured" at BBC Online
 A first look at Life, preview video from the Discovery Channel (USA)
 Sneak Peek: Discovery's "Life"  – slideshow by Life magazine

BBC television documentaries
BBC high definition shows
Documentary films about nature
2009 British television series debuts
2009 British television series endings
2000s British documentary television series
Discovery Channel original programming
Television series by BBC Studios
Documentary television shows about evolution